The NeoRacer is a portable magnetic fitness bike that interacts with video games on several platforms. This includes the Xbox, GameCube, PlayStation, PlayStation 2 and the PC.

Description
The pedal motion controls speed in the game. It comes with a DualShock controller for all of the other functions. The pedal motion can be assigned to any button on the DualShock controller. The NeoRacer works best with driving and racing games.

Developer
NeoRacer was developed by Deep Ridge Ltd. They also hold copyright and licensing of NeoRacer.  The company is located in the United Kingdom.

References

External links
Official Website
ConsoleTuner Titan Two

Fitness games
Xbox (console) accessories
GameCube accessories
PlayStation (console) accessories
PlayStation 2 accessories